The Beast is a 2020 Italian action thriller film directed by Ludovico Di Martino and starring Fabrizio Gifuni, Lino Musella and Monica Piseddu.

Cast

References

External links
 
 

2020 films
2020 action thriller films
Italian-language Netflix original films
Italian action thriller films
2020s Italian-language films
2020s Italian films